Kim Nam-sun (born May 3, 1981) is a South Korean handball player who competed at the 2008 Summer Olympics.

In 2008, she won a bronze medal with the South Korean team.

External links

Living people
South Korean female handball players
Olympic handball players of South Korea
Handball players at the 2008 Summer Olympics
Olympic bronze medalists for South Korea
Olympic medalists in handball
Medalists at the 2008 Summer Olympics
Sportspeople from Gangwon Province, South Korea
South Korean Buddhists
1981 births